Yermo may refer to:

 Yermo, California, a town in the United States
 Yermo (plant), a genus of the tribe Senecioneae and the family Asteraceae
 José Maria Yermo, Spanish footballer